Pliva d.o.o. is a pharmaceutical company based in Zagreb, Croatia that primarily manufactures and sells generic drugs. It is a subsidiary of Teva Pharmaceuticals.

Pliva is one of the world's largest producers of generic Adderall.

History
The company was founded in 1921.

A team of Pliva's researchers, Gabrijela Kobrehel, Gorjana Radobolja-Lazarevski and Zrinka Tamburašev led by Dr. Slobodan Đokić, discovered azithromycin in 1980.

In June 2002, the company acquired Sidmak for $152.9 million.

Also in June 2002, Zeljko Peric, the chief financial officer of the company, resigned.

In May 2004, the company received approval from the Food and Drug Administration to sell trospium chloride.

In June 2005, the company received approval to sell a generic version of erythropoietin in Croatia.

In November 2005, the company received approval from the Food and Drug Administration to sell a generic version of Azithromycin, Citalopram, and Ondansetron.

In October 2006, Barr Pharmaceuticals acquired Pliva.

On December 23, 2008, Barr Pharmaceuticals was acquired by Teva Pharmaceuticals and the company became part of Teva Active Pharmaceutical Ingredients (TAPI).

References

1921 establishments in Croatia
Manufacturing companies based in Zagreb
Croatian brands
Pharmaceutical companies established in 1921
Pharmaceutical companies of Croatia
2006 mergers and acquisitions